Winkler is a small lunar impact crater on the far side of the Moon. It is located about one crater diameter to the south-southeast of Dunér. This feature forms a circular, cup-shaped depression in the surface. A small, relatively fresh crater lies across the eastern rim.

Satellite craters
By convention these features are identified on lunar maps by placing the letter on the side of the crater midpoint that is closest to Winkler.

References

 
 
 
 
 
 
 
 
 
 
 
 

Impact craters on the Moon